Aulaqi, Awlaki, or Awlaqi may refer to:

People
Anwar al-Awlaki (1971–2011), Yemeni-American imam and reported member of al-Qaeda in the Arabian Peninsula
Abdulrahman al-Awlaki (1995-2011), son of Anwar al-Awlaki and American citizen killed in U.S. drone strike
Nasser al-Awlaki, former Yemeni minister of agriculture and Anwar al-Awlaki's father
Nawar al-Awlaki (2008-2017), daughter of Anwar al-Awlaki and American citizen killed in U.S. drone strike
Nihal Ali al-Awlaqi, Minister of Legal Affairs in Yemen
Saeed Aulaqi (born 1940), Yemeni dramatist and fiction writer
Saleh Al-Aulaqi (1938–1973), Yemeni politician and diplomat

Places
Aulaqi Sultanate, state encompassing the territory of the following three prior to the 18th century
Lower Aulaqi Sultanate
Upper Aulaqi Sheikhdom
Upper Aulaqi Sultanate

Arabic-language surnames